The East Meets West Tour '09 was a concert tour by hard rock band Extreme, taking place in the summer of 2009, in support of their 2008 album Saudades de Rock. It followed the Take Us Alive World Tour in 2008 which was in support of the same album. The tour started with a performance at the M3 Rock Festival on May 30, with the official tour beginning on July 12. This tour was co-headlined with Ratt on almost all dates, excluding New Haven, Springfield and Boston.

Set list

Tour dates

 * = Extreme only

Personnel
Gary Cherone – lead vocals
Nuno Bettencourt – lead guitar, vocals
Pat Badger – bass, backing vocals
Kevin Figueiredo –  drums, percussion

References

2009 concert tours